The following is an incomplete list of Australian Army generals (i.e. a list of people who are or have been general officers in the Australian Army). For other senior ranking officers, see list of Australian Army brigadiers.

Ranks

The senior Australian Army ranks are:
Senior Officer: brigadier.
General: brigadier general, major general, lieutenant general, general.
Marshal: field marshal.

List

See also 
 List of Australian admirals and commodores
 List of Australian air marshals
 :Category:Australian generals
 :Category:Australian brigadiers
 :Category:Royal Australian Navy admirals
 :Category:Royal Australian Air Force air marshals

References 
Footnotes

Citations

External links 
 General Officers of the First AIF at www.aif.adfa.edu.au
 Australian Generals of WWII at www.generals.dk
 Current Chief of Army at www.defence.gov.au
 Australian WWI 1st Div.

Australian Army

Australian generals
Generals